Connor Chadney Kurran-Browne (born 26 January 2002) is a professional footballer who plays as a forward for Hampton & Richmond Borough. Born in England, he plays international football for Guyana.

Career
Kurran-Browne was born in Hemel Hempstead, and grew up in Batford, Harpenden. He began playing football with his local club Harpenden Colts before joining the youth academy of Watford. In 2018, he moved to the youth academy of Bournemouth. In the summer of 2020 he signed to the club on a professional contract dating 2 years. Kurran-Browne was released at the end of the 2021–22 season following promotion to the Premier League.

On 11 December 2021, Kurran-Browne joined National League side King's Lynn Town on a one-month loan deal.

On 2 June 2022, Kurran-Browne agreed to join Hampton & Richmond Borough following his release from Bournemouth.

International career
Born in England, Kurran-Browne is of Czech and Guyanese descent. He was called up to a preliminary Guyana national team squad in June 2021.

References

External links
 

2002 births
Living people
Sportspeople from Hemel Hempstead
English footballers
English people of Guyanese descent
English people of Czech descent
Association football forwards
AFC Bournemouth players
King's Lynn Town F.C. players
Hampton & Richmond Borough F.C. players
National League (English football) players